Howard B. Thorsen (born 1933) is a retired United States Coast Guard vice admiral. He served as Commander of the Coast Guard Atlantic Area and the United States Maritime Defense Zone Atlantic.

References

1933 births
Living people
United States Coast Guard admirals